Cave Spring is a census-designated place (CDP) in Roanoke County, Virginia, United States. The population was 26,755 at the 2020 census.  Cave Spring covers much of the area known locally as "Southwest County" which has the most affluent suburbs of Roanoke. It is part of the Roanoke Metropolitan Statistical Area.

Roanoke County's administrative offices are located in Cave Spring, though the independent city of Salem is officially the county seat.

The United States Postal Service considers most of the Cave Spring area to be unincorporated Roanoke City.

Geography
Cave Spring is located at  (37.233170, −80.006252).

According to the United States Census Bureau, the CDP has a total area of 11.8 square miles (30.6 km2), all of it land.

Demographics
As of the census of 2000, there were 24,941 people, 10,997 households, and 7,082 families residing in the CDP. The population density was 2,108.1 people per square mile (814.0/km2). There were 11,556 housing units at an average density of 976.8/sq mi (377.2/km2). The racial makeup of the CDP was 92.96% White, 2.43% African American, 0.08% Native American, 2.96% Asian, 0.02% Pacific Islander, 0.45% from other races, and 1.10% from two or more races. Hispanic or Latino of any race were 1.51% of the population.

There were 10,997 households, out of which 27.6% had children under the age of 18 living with them, 54.2% were married couples living together, 7.9% had a female householder with no husband present, and 35.6% were non-families. 30.5% of all households were made up of individuals, and 10.1% had someone living alone who was 65 years of age or older. The average household size was 2.26 and the average family size was 2.84.

In the CDP, the population was spread out, with 22.1% under the age of 18, 6.9% from 18 to 24, 27.9% from 25 to 44, 27.3% from 45 to 64, and 15.8% who were 65 years of age or older. The median age was 41 years. For every 100 females there were 89.8 males. For every 100 females age 18 and over, there were 86.6 males.

The median income for a household in the CDP was $51,182, and the median income for a family was $64,550. Males had a median income of $43,350 versus $29,242 for females. The per capita income for the CDP was $30,318. About 1.7% of families and 3.2% of the population were below the poverty line, including 2.6% of those under age 18 and 2.4% of those age 65 or over.

Education
Cave Spring is served by Roanoke County Public Schools and includes two high schools:
 Cave Spring High School
 Hidden Valley High School

Notable residents
 Ronde Barber- cornerback, Tampa Bay Buccaneers
 Tiki Barber- running back, New York Giants
 Gregg Marshall- head basketball coach, Wichita State University
 J. J. Redick- shooting guard, Philadelphia 76ers

References

Census-designated places in Roanoke County, Virginia